Chhokar v Chhokar [1984] FLR 313 is an English land law case concerning constructive trusts law and widening the natural meaning of "actual occupation" (which protects the occupier by virtue of the Land Registration Act 2002, Schedule 3, being an overriding interest).  The facts of the case showed an intention to do a woman out of her (and her children's) occupational interest in a matrimonial home, as the new co-owner buying his share from the husband knew of her situation from the outset and wished to resell the property.  The court confirmed in these exact circumstances her interest was overriding at the time when she was in hospital and it was a constructive trust.

Facts
Mr and Mrs Chhokar married on 18 April 1975. 

May 1977: Mr Chhokar bought 60 Clarence Street, Southall, for the purchase price of £9250 with a deposit of £700. Mrs Chhokar substantially contributed to the family fortunes to the tune of approximately £3000.

1978: There were matrimonial difficulties and they both travelled to India to visit their parents. Mr Chhokar tries to abandon her in India but Mrs Chhokar returns in November 1978, a few weeks later.

December 1978: An acquaintance of Mr Chhokar, Mr Parmar, visits the house under the guise of a potential lodger. They sign a contract of sale for the marital home for £12700 (an undervalue) and the date of completion was fixed at 12 February. This was the date on which Mrs Chhokar was scheduled to deliver their second child in hospital.

However, Mrs Chhokar did not deliver on 12 February. She delivered on the 16th and so the men deferred the completion of the sale until then. Mr Parmar then put the house on the market for £18,000. When Mrs Chhokar returned, she discovered the locks had been changed. She broke in but was forced out by Mr Parmar who threatened and assaulted her. Mrs Chhokar managed to gain entry to the house again and stayed put.

The question for the court was whether Mrs Chhokar could be said to be in 'actual occupation' even though she was not physically present in the house at the time of the transfer (sale).

Judgment

High Court
Ewbank J ordered that Mr Parmar held the property on trust for himself and Mrs Chhokar in equal shares; that it be sold in 9 months; and until then, she must pay him a rent of £8 a week. She appealed, arguing she should stay rent-free until a sale.

Court of Appeal
The Court of Appeal, sitting as a panel of two judges, held the purpose of the trust was to give Mrs Chhokar and her children a home. There was no reason for an order for sale, having regard to the interest of third parties. Because Mr Parmar stepped into Mr Chhokar’s shoes, it would be inequitable for her to have to pay an occupational rent, but he should be entitled to credit for paying off the mortgage. Accordingly, she and Mr Parmar held the house as tenants in common in equity in equal shares. Cumming-Bruce LJ remarked that for the question about whether an order for sale should be made, bankruptcy case law was analogous and relevant. He first referred to Goff LJ in Re Holliday [1981] 1 Ch 405, before continuing his judgment.

He held the judge at first instance was wrong to make an order for sale.

Reeve J concurred.

See also

English land law
English property law

Similar cases
Bannister v Bannister
Binions v Evans

References

English land case law
1984 in British law
1984 in case law
Court of Appeal (England and Wales) cases